Jaywalkin' is the first album solely credited to Danish bassist Niels-Henning Ørsted Pedersen which was recorded in 1975 and released on the Danish SteepleChase label.

Reception

In his review for AllMusic, Ken Dryden called the album "a bit of a mixed bag" and said "Fortunately, Pedersen rarely utilized electric piano on future sessions as a leader".<ref name="Allmusic">{{allMusic|first=Ken|last=Dryden|class=album|id=mw0000902046|title=Jaywalkin''' – Review|accessdate= March 19, 2015}}</ref>

Track listingAll compositions by Niels-Henning Ørsted Pedersen except as indicated''
 "Summer Song" - 5:15
 "Sparkling Eyes" - 5:12 		
 "A Felicidade" (Antônio Carlos Jobim) - 6:15
 "Jaywalkin'" - 6:13
 "My Little Anna" - 6:25
 "Yesterday's Future" - 5:34
 "Interlude" - 1:44
 "Cheryl" (Charlie Parker) - 5:31 		
 "That's All" (Alan Brandt, Bob Haymes) - 2:58
 "Summer Song #5" - 5:09 Bonus track on CD reissue

Personnel
Niels-Henning Ørsted Pedersen - bass 
Philip Catherine - guitar
Ole Kock Hansen - electric piano
Billy Higgins - drums

References

1975 albums
Niels-Henning Ørsted Pedersen albums
SteepleChase Records albums